Royal York is a subway station on Line 2 Bloor–Danforth of the Toronto subway in Toronto, Ontario, Canada. It is located just north of Bloor Street West on the east side of Royal York Road. Wi-Fi service is available at this station.

History
The station was opened in 1968 in what was then the Borough of Etobicoke.

The original plan for the Bloor-Danforth extension to Islington had different stations than what was eventually built. The stations were to be at "Montgomery" and "Prince Edward", instead of Islington and Royal York. This was probably because these two streets were the ends of the Kingsway shopping district. However, it was decided to include only one station in the Kingsway, at Royal York.

Until 1973 the buses and the subway trains serving the station were in separate fare zones and so the turnstiles and collector booths were on the mezzanine level between the bus bays and the subway platforms. When the zones were abolished, they were moved to just inside the street entrance, bringing the buses inside the station's fare-paid area.

A local "zone 2" bus service continued to run along Bloor Street west of Jane, paralleling the "zone 1" subway, from the station's opening through the zone abolishment in 1973, and continued to run even after the bus and subway were in the same zone. The success of the bus service may be attributed to the distances between subway stops in Etobicoke; Royal York is over 1 km west of Old Mill, and Islington is over 1 km west of Royal York. (By comparison, stops at Montgomery, Prince Edward and Old Mill would all be within 1 km of each other, as are all stops on the Bloor-Danforth from Old Mill through Main Street, an east-west corridor served almost entirely by the subway line.) The local bus service was discontinued in 1984, although the long station spacing remains; only at night are buses still seen along this stretch.

Construction began in mid-2017 to make the station fully accessible, including the addition of three elevators and accessible fare gates. On December 16, 2019, the station became accessible with the completion of the elevator construction.

Nearby landmarks
Nearby landmarks include Our Lady of Sorrows Roman Catholic Church in the Kingsway and Mimico Creek.

Surface connections 

TTC routes serving the station include:

References

External links

Line 2 Bloor–Danforth stations
Railway stations in Canada opened in 1968
Transport in Etobicoke